Director General of Bangladesh Coast Guard (abbreviated as BCG) also known as 'Coast Guard chief' is the professional head of the Bangladesh Coast Guard . The current DG is Ashraful Hoq Chowdhury The first BCG chief was Shafiq-ur-Rahman.

The Director General  functions from the Bangladesh Coast Guard Headquarters, which is located in, Dhaka.

List of Director Generals

References

Director Generals of Bangladesh Coast Guard
Bangladesh Coast Guard